Khālid ibn ʿAbd al‐Malik al‐Marwarrūdhī was a 9th-century Baghdadi astronomer.

In 827, Marwarrūdhī, together with the astronomer ʿAlī ibn ʿĪsā al-Asṭurlābī and a party of surveyors, measured the length of a meridian arc of one degree of latitude. The party travelled to the Nineveh Plains in the valley of the Tigris, at 35 degrees north latitude. The two researchers measured in Arabian , and determined the geographical latitudes of the end points they used from the star altitudes in a celestial horizontal coordinate system.

Marwarrūdhī  was chosen by the geometer Al-Abbās ibn Said al-Jawharī to organize a new observatory on Mount Qasioun. Despite encountering technical difficulties caused by the distortion of the astronomical instruments, in  he spent a year obtaining of solar and lunar observations of the Sun and the Moon. He played a role in the project  determine the length of the spring season by means of astronomical observations.

Marwarrūdhī was the first of three generations of astronomers.

References

Sources 
  (PDF version)

Further reading
 

Geodesists
9th-century Iranian astronomers
Astronomers of the medieval Islamic world